The air sports competition at the 2013 World Games was held from August 3 to August 4 in Cali, Colombia.

Medal summary

Medal table

Events

References 

2013 World Games
World Games
2013